A Seven-Faced Man is a 2017 Chinese streaming television series starring Zhang Yishan and Cai Wenjing. It is a remake of the 2015 South Korea television series Kill Me, Heal Me written by Jin Soo-wan. The series premiered on Tencent Video starting December 13, 2017.

Synopsis
Shen Yizhen is a third generation of successors of Shenhua Group. He has multiple personalites. When he meets his psychiatrist Bai Xinxin, he falls in love with her.

Cast

Main
 Zhang Yishan as Shen Yizhen
A 28-year-old postgraduate of a famous American university, the third generation successor of Shenhua Group. He is kindhearted and gentle, but certain traumatic events from his mysterious past cloud his everyday life. 
Cui Haoyue: A vehement guy with a devil-may-care demeanor who appears when Shen Yizhen experiences violence. He is the only identity to have all of Shen Yizhen's childhood memories. His first love is Bai Xinxin.
Zhu Changjiang: A man with an affinity for building bombs and drinking alcohol. He is erratic and fun-loving. 
Mo Xiaojun:  An intelligent boy who is musically gifted, but often has suicidal thoughts. 
Mo Xiaona: An extrovert and mischievous young girl who loves idols and shopping. She  has a crush on Bai Xiangrong.

 Cai Wenjing as Bai Xinxin
An intern at a hospital in Shanghai who is quirky and optimistic. Although she has a carefree exterior, Bai Xinxin harbors a deep and dark secret. 
 Zhang Xiaoqian as Bai Xiangrong
A  famous mystery novelist. Bai Xinxin's brother. 
 Gao Taiyu as Shen Dongjie
Shen Yizhen's cousin and rival, with both competing to inherit their family's company.
Fan Meng as Su Wanyan 
Shen Yizhen's first love.

Supporting
 Wu Mian as Wang Huizhen
 Li Youlin as Bai Tianzhen
 Yang Ping as He Meilan
 Wang Sen as Chang Boqian
 Cui Zhigang as Shen Che
 Zhang Shuangli as Shen Jinghong
 Wang Jinghua as Lu Yue
 Wei Zixin as Shen Chun
 Xu Rongzhen as Fan Qiuying

Production

Principal photography started in Shanghai and Kunshan on February 16, 2017 and wrapped on May 30, 2017.

On August 26, 2016, the producers released posters on the China International Film & TV Programs Exhibition.

On November 29, 2017, the producers released a trailer and official posters.

Reception
The drama received positive reception. It attracted more than 100 million views on Tencent Video within a day of its premiere.

Awards and nominations

References

External links
 
 

Chinese web series
Tencent original programming
Television series by Huace Media
2017 Chinese television series debuts
Chinese romance television series
Chinese medical television series
Chinese television series based on South Korean television series
2017 web series debuts